The Runner (Persian: Davandeh دونده ) is a 1984 film by Amir Naderi, one of the major directors of Iranian cinema before and after the Iranian Revolution.

The Runner was perhaps the first of the post-revolution Iranian films to attract worldwide attention. It set the tone for many of the films which followed: realism, child's eye perspective of the world, innocence, gentleness, set in poor neighbourhoods, exposing great disparities in wealth, resting much of the film on the shoulders of one young actor, using children's lives as analogies for, or explicit expositions of, the problems of the adult world. The film has been celebrated for presenting an authentic image of the encounter with modernity in Iranian cinema.

References

External links

https://www.slantmagazine.com/film/godfrey-cheshire-on-close-up-abbas-kiarostami-1990/
https://journals.kpu.ca/index.php/msq/article/view/1691

1980s Persian-language films
Iranian drama films
1984 films
Films directed by Amir Naderi
Films shot in Iran
1984 drama films